The 1900 Army Cadets football team represented the United States Military Academy in the 1900 college football season. In their fourth and final season under head coach Herman Koehler, the Cadets compiled a 7–3–1 record, shut out seven opponents (including a scoreless tie with Penn State), and outscored all opponents by a combined total of 109 to 68.  The team's three losses came in games against Harvard (29–0), national champion Yale (18–0), and Navy (11–7).

Army end Walter Smith is recognized by the NCAA as a consensus first-team player on the 1900 College Football All-America Team, having received first-team honors from Caspar Whitney and third-team honors from Walter Camp.  Tackle Edward Farnsworth also received third-team honors from Camp.

Schedule

References

Army
Army Black Knights football seasons
Army Cadets football